
Year 465 BC was a year of the pre-Julian Roman calendar. At the time, it was known as the Year of the Consulship of Vibulanus and Barbatus (or, less frequently, year 289 Ab urbe condita). The denomination 465 BC for this year has been used since the early medieval period, when the Anno Domini calendar era became the prevalent method in Europe for naming years.

Events 
 By place 
 Persian Empire 
 King Xerxes I of the Persian Empire, together with his eldest son, is murdered by one of his Ministers, Artabanus the Hyrcanian. The Persian general, Megabyzus, is thought to have been one of the conspirators in the assassination.
 Artabanus gains control of the Achaemenid state for several months. However, he is betrayed by Megabyzus and is killed by Xerxes' son, Artaxerxes.

 Greece 
 Thasos revolts from the Delian League. The revolt arises from rivalry over trade with the Thracian hinterland and, in particular, over the ownership of a gold mine. Athens under Kimon lays siege to Thasos after the Athenian fleet defeats the Thasos fleet

 By topic 
 Arts 
 Tholos, west side of Ancient Agora of Athens, is built (approximate date).
 Phidias begins producing the sculpture called The Athena Promachos (The Defender) and completes it ten years later.

Births

Deaths 
 Xerxes I, king of Persia (murdered) (b. c. 519 BC)
 King Goujian of Yue, king of the Chinese State of Yue

References